El Tor Airport  is an airport serving the Suez Gulf port city of  El Tor, Sinai Peninsula, Egypt.

Airlines and destinations 
There are currently no scheduled services to and from the airport.

See also
Transport in Egypt
List of airports in Egypt

References

External links
 OurAirports - Egypt
   Great Circle Mapper - El Tor
 El Tor Airport

Airports in Egypt